The Shire of Omeo was a local government area about  east-north-east of Melbourne, the state capital of Victoria, Australia.

History

Omeo was incorporated as a shire on 25 October 1872.

On 2 December 1994, the Shire of Omeo was abolished, and along with the City of Bairnsdale, the Shires of Bairnsdale and Tambo, and the Boole Boole Peninsula from the Shire of Rosedale, was merged into the newly created Shire of East Gippsland. The Dinner Plain district was merged into the Shire of Alpine, which had been created two weeks earlier.

Ridings

Omeo was divided into four ridings on 15 January 1957, each of which elected three councillors:
 Omeo Riding
 Ensay Riding
 Hinnomunjie Riding
 Tongio Riding

Towns and localities
 Benambra
 Brookville
 Cassilis
 Dinner Plain
 Doctors Flat
 Ensay
 Hinnomunjie
 Omeo*
 Swifts Creek
 Tambo Crossing
 Tongio
 Uplands

* Council seat.

Population

* Estimate in the 1958 Victorian Year Book.

References

External links
 Victorian Places - Omeo Shire

Omeo